Mrad or MRAD may refer to:

People
 Abdul Rahim Mrad (born 1942), Lebanese politician and former government minister
 Antón Arrufat Mrad (born 1935), Cuban dramatist, novelist, short story writer, poet and essayist
 Imen Mrad (born 1992), Tunisian footballer
 Shlomi Mrad (born 1989), Israeli footballer
 Mrad Mahjoub (born 1945), Tunisian football manager

Other uses
 abbreviation of milliradian, a unit of angle
 Barrett MRAD, a bolt-action sniper rifle

See also
 Béchara Abou Mrad (1853–1930), Lebanese Melkite priest and monk
 Joseph Abou Mrad (1933–2003), Lebanese football player and manager
 Bchira Ben Mrad (1913–1993), Tunisian women's rights activist
 Mehdi Ben Mrad (born ), Tunisian football goalkeeper
 Mohamed Salah Ben Mrad (1881–1979), Tunisian theologian, journalist and intellectual